Higher Town is a hamlet in Roche parish, mid Cornwall, England, lying about  northeast of Roche village at .

References

Hamlets in Cornwall